Jose Thiago Mangini (4 January 1920 – 10 February 1984) was a Brazilian chess player. He was twice Brazilian Chess Champion, in 1950 and  1956.

Biography 
In the 1950s, Mangini was one of the leading Brazilian chess players. He participated in many Brazilian Chess Championships where he won two gold (1950, 1956) and a silver (1951) medals. In 1951 and 1957, he represented Brazil in the World Chess Championship South America Zonal tournaments. Mangini participated in several major international chess tournaments which took place in Brazil.

Mangini played for Brazil in the Chess Olympiad: 
 In 1952, at third board in the 10th Chess Olympiad in Helsinki (+5, =1, -3).

References

External links

Jose Thiago Mangini chess games at 365Chess

1920 births
1984 deaths
Sportspeople from Rio de Janeiro (city)
Brazilian chess players
Chess Olympiad competitors